Mark Paul Leone (born 1940) is an American archaeologist and professor of anthropology at the University of Maryland, College Park. He is interested in critical theory as it applies to archaeology and, particularly, to historical archaeology. He has directed Archaeology in Annapolis since 1981. This project focuses on the historical archaeology of Annapolis and Maryland's Eastern Shore and features the use of critical theory. Leone is committed to public interpretation and teaches his students about the relationship between public interpretation and the politics of archaeology.

Education
Leone earned a Bachelor of Arts in history in 1963 at Tufts University.  He received a Master of Arts in 1966 and a doctorate of philosophy in 1968, both from the University of Arizona, in anthropology.

Academic career
He was an assistant professor in the Department of Anthropology at Princeton University from 1968 to 1975 before moving to the University of Maryland as an associate professor from 1976 to 1990. He became a full professor in 1990. He has been the director of the University of Maryland Field School in Urban Historical Archaeology since 1981. Leone's research areas include North American archaeology, historical archaeology and outdoor history museums. In 1976, Leone began teaching at the University of Maryland, where he became the chair of the Department of Anthropology between 1993 and 2003 and chair of the University Senate in 2000 - 2001. Leone began an “Archaeology in Annapolis” project in 1981.

In 2016, Leone was presented the J. C. Harrington Award by the Society for Historical Archaeology (SHA).

In 2019, Leone was conferred the title of Distinguished University Professor at the University of Maryland, the highest academic honor that the University bestows on a faculty member.

Archaeology in Annapolis (AiA) Project 
Archaeology in Annapolis has run consistently since 1981 in Annapolis, at Wye House, where Frederick Douglass was enslaved, at William Paca’s Wye Hall on Wye Island, and on “The Hill,” an African American community in Easton, Maryland.

Site reports with catalogs on nearly 40 excavations can be found on the University of Maryland’s Digital Archive, known as DRUM. A physical component of the collection is housed in the National Trust room of Hornbake Library on the University of Maryland campus.

Some of the most significant sites excavated by the project include:

 18AP01: The William Paca House and Garden
 18AP45: Charles Carroll House and Garden (1987-1990 Report and 1991 Report)
 18AP29: Jonas Green Print Shop
 18TA314: Wye House and Greenhouse (Hothouse Structure, Greenhouse Interior, Wye Greenhouse, and The Long Green
 18QU977: Wye Hall (2003 Report and 2008 Report)
 18AP64: Maynard-Burgess House
 18AP116: James Holliday House
 18AP23: Reynolds Tavern
 18AP74: Slayton House
 18AP50: Bordley- Randall House
 18AP18: Dr. Upton Scott House
 18AP40: Rideout Garden
 18AP22: State Circle in Annapolis
 18AP28: Calvert House
 18AP47: Sands House
 Fleet and Cornhill Streets
 18AP109: 26 Market Street
 18AP111: Fleet Street
 18AP112: Cornhill Street
 18AP44: 193 Main Street (Preliminary Report 1986 and Final Report 1994)

Virtual tours of archaeological sites in Annapolis and exhibits from Annapolis and Easton can be found at the following links:  

 Seeking Liberty Annapolis: An Imagined Community
 Wye House

People of Wye House contains censuses done by the Lloyd family of people they enslaved. This can be found at http://aia.umd.edu/wyehouse/.

All University of Maryland Department of Anthropology dissertations on Annapolis can be found at https://drum.lib.umd.edu/handle/1903/10991.

A list of newspaper articles by date and name of reporter from the Annapolis Evening Capital can be found here.

An overview historical maps, historical photographs, and the result of excavations on an interactive database can be found at http://preservationsearchwebgis.anth.umd.edu/.

Selected publications
Edited Books

2010      Critical Historical Archaeology. Left Coast Press.

2015      Historical Archaeologies of Capitalism, Second Edition. Edited with Jocelyn E. Knauf. Springer, New York. (eBook published @ http://link.springer.com/book/10.1007/978-3-319-12760-6).

Refereed Journal Articles

1977      The New Mormon Temple in Washington, D. C.  In Historical Archaeology and the Importance of Material Things.  Historical Archaeology.  Special Publication Series 2:43-61.  Reprinted in Sunstone (a Mormon journal), September-October, 1978.

1998        Seeing: The Power of Town Planning in the Chesapeake, with Silas D. Hurry. Historical Archaeology, 32:4:34-62. Reprinted in Revealing Landscapes. Society for   Historical Archaeology’s series Perspectives from Historical Archaeology 2010.

2006      LiDAR for Archaeological Landscape Analysis: A Case Study of Two Eighteenth Century Maryland Plantation Sites.  With James M. Harmon, Stephen D. Prince, and Marcia Snyder.  American Antiquity 71:4:649-670.

2018      Waste, with Michael P. Roller. Cuadernos de Prehistoria y Arqueología de la Universidad de Granada 28:175–196.

Chapters in Books

1984      Interpreting Ideology in Historical Archaeology:  Using the Rules of Perspective in the William Paca Garden in Annapolis, Maryland.  In Ideology, Representation and Power in Prehistory, Tilley, C. and D. Miller, editors, pp. 25-35.  Cambridge University Press.  Reprinted in Readings in Historical Archaeology, edited by Charles E. Orser, Jr. Alta Mira Press/Sage Publications, 1996.

2001      Spirit Management among Americans of African Descent. Mark P. Leone, Gladys-Marie Fry and Tim Ruppel.  In Race and the Archaeology of Identity, edited by C. Orser, pp. 143-157. University of Utah Press.

2010    Walter Taylor and the Production of Anger in American Archaeology.  In Prophet,     Pariah, and Pioneer: Walter W. Taylor and Dissension  in American Archaeology, edited by Maca, Allen, Reyman, Jonathon, and Folan, William,  pp. 315-330. University of Colorado Press, Boulder, Colorado.

References

External links
 Staff website at the Center for Heritage Resource Studies
 
Faculty Profile University of Maryland Department of Anthropology Website\
Archaeology in Annapolis Website
Archaeology in Annapolis records at the University of Maryland Libraries

1940 births
American anthropologists
21st-century American historians
21st-century American male writers
Historians of the Latter Day Saint movement
Living people
Princeton University faculty
Tufts University School of Arts and Sciences alumni
University of Arizona alumni
University of Maryland, College Park faculty
University of Maryland College of Behavioral and Social Sciences people
American male non-fiction writers